Lachung Monastery is a Nyingma Buddhist gompa in the Lachung Valley, Sikkim, northeastern India. It was established in 1880.

Lachung means a 'small mountain'. Lachung is at an elevation of about 3,000 m (9,600 ft) at the confluence of the Lachen River and Lachung River, tributaries of the Teesta River. The word Lachung means "small mountain". The village is 118 km from Gangtok on the North Sikkim Highway and is the last one before the Indo-Chinese border. It was a trading post between India and Tibet before China forcefully annexed Tibet in 1950. Permits are required for visits to North Sikkim. The monastery hosts a famous mask dance each year.

Footnotes

References
 Singh, Sarina, et al. India, (2009), p. 606. Lonely Planet. .

External links
 
 Photos of monastery at: Panoramio is no longer available and LACHUNG MONASTERY, North Sikkim, India

Buddhist monasteries in Sikkim
Nyingma monasteries and temples
1880 establishments in India